Jason Lewis may refer to:

 Jason Lewis (actor) (born 1971), American actor and former fashion model
 Jason Lewis (adventurer) (born 1967), self-powered English circumnavigator
 Jason Lewis (comedian) (born 1981), British actor, writer and comedian of Trinidadian descent
 Jason Lewis (Massachusetts politician) (born 1968), American state legislator in the Massachusetts Senate
 Jason Lewis (Minnesota politician) (born 1955), United States Representative representing Minnesota's 2nd district, 2020 Republican nominee for US Senate, former radio talk show host
 Jason Lewis (murderer) (born 1979), American murderer who murdered his parents in 1995
 Jason J. Lewis (born 1973), American voice actor
 Jason S. Lewis, British radiochemist
 Jason Lewis (born 1970), birth name of West Coast rapper AMG

See also
Jay Lewis (disambiguation)